Ernst Schröder (27 January 1915 – 26 July 1994) was a popular German theatre, film and TV actor.

Life
Born in Herne, Schröder began his acting career at the nearby Bochum Theatre in 1934, under the director Saladin Schmitt. He worked there until 1936, also working as assistant director and Stage Designer. After working at Bielefeld and Wuppertal, he moved to the Schiller Theatre in Berlin in 1938, which became his artistic home and the location of his greatest triumphs, particularly after the Second World War.

During the war he served briefly in the army, was wounded, and returned to the Schiller Theatre in 1942. When in 1944 the theatre was closed, he returned to serve in the army, and ended the war in Italy as a prisoner. He returned to the theatre in 1946 and rapidly re-established his reputation.

He was a member of the jury at the 7th Berlin International Film Festival in 1957.

He was considered one of the greatest character actors of the German theatre, enjoying larger than life roles. He was frequently compared with the pre-war star Heinrich George. In addition, he frequently acted in Zurich and Munich. Although he concentrated on stage work, both as actor and director, he occasionally appeared in film roles, most notably as German General Hans von Salmuth in the 1962 film The Longest Day.

He achieved broader popularity in the 1970s, appearing more frequently on television, particularly in crime shows like Derrick and Der Alte.

In 1980, his daughter, the actress Christiane Schröder (18 January 1942 – 17 September 1980), committed suicide by jumping off the Golden Gate Bridge in San Francisco.

In 1981, he staged a production of Shakespeare's King Lear at the Bad Hersfeld Festival.

In 1991–92, he appeared as the narrator in a dramatised radio version of The Lord of the Rings.

Throughout his career, Schröder also dubbed the voices of popular English-speaking actors into German. Amongst others, he provided the voices for Charles Boyer, James Cagney, William Conrad, Rex Harrison, Herbert Lom, Spencer Tracy and Peter Ustinov.

At the age of 79, Schröder was diagnosed with cancer at a Berlin hospital. He committed suicide on 26 July 1994 by jumping out of a window.

Theatre

Filmography

Television

References

External links

 
 

1915 births
1994 deaths
Suicides by jumping in Germany
German male stage actors
German male film actors
German male television actors
Commanders Crosses of the Order of Merit of the Federal Republic of Germany
People from Herne, North Rhine-Westphalia
20th-century German male actors
1994 suicides
German Army personnel of World War II